Mikael Banzon Daez (born January 6, 1988) is a Filipino commercial model, actor, news anchor, television and events presenter, and vlogger. Daez is well known for his starring role in Amaya, a Philippine historical drama, alongside Marian Rivera. He also starred in 2011 in the remake of the hit blockbuster 1980s film Temptation Island under GMA Films and Regal Films.

Biography
Daez started his career as a commercial model in various advertisements and projects. Later on, Daez started opening his career into acting, and is currently signed with GMA Network in the Philippines.

Personal life
Mikael Daez was born on January 6, 1988, in Manila, Philippines to a family of nine siblings. He attended the Ateneo de Manila University from grade school to college, earning a degree in business management.

His younger sister Bea Daez is a graduate of the University of the Philippines and was a varsity basketball player for the UP Fighting Maroons. She also provides commentaries for the UAAP Men's & Women's Basketball games.

On January 25, 2020, he married his longtime girlfriend Megan Young.

Filmography

Television

Films

Awards

References

External links
Mikael Daez at Sparkle GMA Artist Center

1988 births
Living people
Ateneo de Manila University alumni
Filipino male television actors
Filipino male models
Male actors from Manila
GMA Network personalities
GMA Integrated News and Public Affairs people
Filipino male film actors
Participants in Philippine reality television series